This Time Around may refer to:

Music

Albums
 This Time Around (Hanson album) or the title song (see below), 2000
 This Time Around (Heather Williams album) or the title song, 2011
 This Time Around (Otis Clay album) or the title song, 1998
 This Time Around (Paul Brandt album) or the title song, 2004
 This Time Around: Live in Tokyo, by Deep Purple, or the title song (see below), 2001
 This Time Around (EP), by Tedashii, or the title song, 2016
 This Time Around, by Green on Red, 1989
 This Time Around, by Phats & Small, or the title song, 2001

Songs
 "This Time Around" (Hanson song), 2000
 "This Time Around" (Michael Jackson song), 1995
 "This Time Around", by Benjamin Orr from The Lace, 1986
 "This Time Around", by Brides of Destruction from Runaway Brides, 2005
 "This Time Around", by Cheap Trick from Standing on the Edge, 1985
 "This Time Around", by Jaira Burns from Burn Slow, 2018
 "This Time Around", by Jessica Pratt from Quiet Signs, 2019
 "This Time Around", by Tove Lo from Queen of the Clouds, 2014
 "This Time Around"/"Owed to 'G, by Deep Purple from Come Taste the Band, 1975

Other uses
 This Time Around (film), a 2003 American TV film